Charles Watkin Williams-Wynn (4 October 1822 – 25 April 1896) was a Welsh Conservative politician who sat in the House of Commons from 1868 to 1880.

Williams-Wynn was the son of Charles Williams-Wynn, who was MP for Montgomeryshire 1796–1850, and his wife Mary Cunliffe daughter of Sir Foster Cunliffe, 3rd Baronet. He was educated at Westminster School and at Christ Church, Oxford graduating BA in 1843 and MA in 1846. He was called to the bar at Lincoln's Inn in May 1846. He was a Deputy Lieutenant and J.P. for Montgomeryshire, and captain in the Montgomery Yeomanry Cavalry.

In 1862 Williams-Wynn was elected Member of Parliament for Montgomeryshire. He held the seat until 1880.

Williams-Wynn died at the age of 73.

Williams-Wynn married Lady Annora Charlotte Pierrepont daughter of Charles Pierrepont, 2nd Earl Manvers. They had a daughter, Mary Williams-Wynn, who married Henry Goulburn Chetwynd Stapylton JP in 1886.

References

External links 
 

1822 births
1896 deaths
People educated at Westminster School, London
Alumni of Christ Church, Oxford
Members of Lincoln's Inn
Deputy Lieutenants of Montgomeryshire
Conservative Party (UK) MPs for Welsh constituencies
UK MPs 1859–1865
UK MPs 1865–1868
UK MPs 1868–1874
UK MPs 1874–1880